Selagiaforma is a monotypic moth genus of the family Pyralidae described by Rolf-Ulrich Roesler in 1982. Its only species, Selagiaforma sandrangatoella, was described by the same author in the same year.

References

Phycitinae
Monotypic moth genera